Morton Barnett Cohen (19 September 1913 – 14 January 1968) was an Australian politician, elected from 1965 to 1968 as a Liberal member of the New South Wales Legislative Assembly, for the electoral district of Bligh. Cohen attended Sydney Boys High School from 1926 to 1931. He played 10 first-class cricket matches for New South Wales and scored a century against Queensland in 1940.

See also
 List of New South Wales representative cricketers

References

Members of the New South Wales Legislative Assembly
Liberal Party of Australia members of the Parliament of New South Wales
Australian sportsperson-politicians
Australian cricketers
New South Wales cricketers
Jewish Australian politicians
Jewish Australian sportspeople
Jewish cricketers
1913 births
1968 deaths
20th-century Australian politicians